A Hot Piece of Grass is the fifth album by American band Hayseed Dixie, released in 2005 (see 2005 in music).

Track listing
 "Black Dog" (Led Zeppelin cover) – 3:07
 "War Pigs" (Black Sabbath cover) – 4:27
 "Holiday" (Green Day cover) – 3:48
 "Rockin' in the Free World" (Neil Young cover) – 3:39
 "Whole Lotta Love" (Led Zeppelin cover) – 3:59
 "Runnin' with the Devil" (Van Halen cover) – 2:44
 "This Fire" (Franz Ferdinand cover) – 3:24
 "Roses" (Outkast cover) – 4:35
 "Blind Beggar Breakdown" – 2:25
 "Kirby Hill" – 2:25
 "Uncle Virgil" – 3:00
 "Mountain Man" – 3:07
 "Marijuana" (The Reverend Horton Heat cover) – 2:54
 "Moonshiner's Daughter" – 2:54	
 "Wish I Was You" – 1:59
 "Dueling Banjos" (Arthur "Guitar Boogie" Smith cover) – 3:13

Many versions also have "Whole Lotta Rosie" (AC/DC cover) and omit "Roses" and "Rockin' In The Free World"

2005 albums
Hayseed Dixie albums
Cooking Vinyl albums
Covers albums